This is a list of Spanish television related events in 1978.

Events 
 25 January: The four directors of the only news program in the country, Telediario, Ladislao Azcona, Eduardo Sotillos, Pedro Macía y Miguel Ángel Gozalo, resign from their position because of disagreements with the channel director.

Debuts

Television shows

La 1

Ending this year

La 1 
 El Mundo en acción (1973-1978) 
 Curro Jiménez (1976-1978)
 Última hora (1976-1978) 
 La Semana (1974-1978) 
 Lengua viva (1977-1978) 
 El Monstruo de Sanchezstein (1977-1978) 
 Las Reglas del juego (1977-1978) 
 Yo canto (1977-1978)

La 2 
 Teatro Club (1976-1978)

Foreign series debuts in Spain

Births 
 9 January - Cristina Lasvignes, presenter
 2 February - Macarena Gómez, actress.
 4 March - María Casado, hostess.
 10 March - Marta Torné, actress.
 9 April - Salva Reina, actor.
 20 May - Edu Soto, actor and comedian.
 26 May - Rocío Madrid, hostess.
 10 June - Vanessa Romero, actress.
 29 June - Jordi Cruz, chef and host.
 16 July - Irene Visedo, actress.
 18 July - Verónica Romero, singer.
 21 July - Marta Flich, actress and hostess.
 1 August - Begoña Maestre, actress.
 12 September - Nacho Rubio, actor.
 11 October - Oriol Nolis, host.
 30 October - Cristina Castaño, actress.
 20 November - Fran Perea, actor and singer.
 27 November - Manu Fullola, actor.
 José Ángel Leiras, host.

Deaths 
 13 August - José María Prada, actor, 53.

See also
 1978 in Spain
 List of Spanish films of 1978

References 

1978 in Spanish television